Hussein Mohamud Sheikh Hussein is a Somali politician. He is the former Minister of Constitutional Affairs of Somalia, having been appointed to the position on 6 February 2015 by former Prime Minister Omar Abdirashid Ali Sharmarke.

He was Former Deputy Prime Minister, Minister of Agriculture and Livestock, FGS. 2012 by Prime Minister Abdiweli Maxamed Ali Gaas.

References

Living people
Government ministers of Somalia
Year of birth missing (living people)